SBST may refer to:

SBS Transit, a public transport operator in Singapore
SBST, the ICAO airport code for Santos Air Base in Santos, São Paulo, Brazil